Drew Nelson may refer to:

Drew Nelson (politician) (1956–2016), Northern Irish Protestant political figure
Drew Nelson (musician), Canadian blues singer, guitarist and songwriter
Drew Nelson (actor) (born 1979), Canadian actor and voice actor
Drew Nelson (footballer), Scottish footballer
Drew Nelson (American Gangster) Born 10/28/1988

See also
Andrew Nelson (disambiguation)